Rizhao Polytechnic (colloquially known as Rizhi,  is a public institution for tertiary education in Rizhao, Shandong province, China, specializing in engineering and technical majors. The college has around 14.000 students and 900 teachers, the campus is located north of the University City in Donggang District.

External links
 Rizhao Polytechnic website 

Universities and colleges in Shandong
Rizhao